British Columbia Telephone Company and later BC Tel was the legal operating name for the telephone company operating throughout the province of British Columbia, Canada. For most of its history, BC Tel served as one of several regional monopolies in Canada. In 1985 the Canadian Radio-Television and Telecommunications Commission (CRTC) ruled to once again allow competition in long-distance telephone service. In 1998, BC Tel merged with Telus to become the second largest telecommunications company in Canada.

History
In 1904 the Victoria & Esquimalt Telephone Company and the New Westminster & Burrard Inlet Telephone Company were taken over by The Vernon & Nelson Telephone Company. On July 5, 1904, the name of the company was changed to the British Columbia Telephone Company Limited. In 1916 the British Columbia Telephone Company Limited obtained a Federal charter and dropped the word Limited from its name.

Theodore Gary & Company bought a substantial interest in BC Telephone in December 1926 held in Canada under the Anglo-Canadian Telephone Company. Other Gary Companies at the time included International Automatic Telephone Company & British Insulated Cables. Mr G H Halse remained as President & General Manager of BC Telephone. BC Telephone participated in Canada's first coast to coast radio broadcast for Canada's Diamond Jubilee, July 1, 1927.

On the 1 April 1929, a charter was obtained for a new company under BC Telephone to be called "North-West Telephone Company". This company was created to experiment with Radio-Telephony as a method to serve areas of the province otherwise unreachable by wire. The first experiment was in providing a connection to Powell River from Campbell River, 50 miles across the water.

A new record for storm damage in the BC Telephone system was set little over a year after the previous record had been set. The rain and sleet began early in the morning of Monday  January 21, 1935. There were 1500 poles and 700 miles of wire down in the Fraser valley. Victoria had 1800 telephones out of service. The trans Canada toll line was not back in service until 10 February 1935. The first photographs ever to be transmitted from Vancouver via wire photo service took place during the royal visit of 29 May 1939.

GTE of Stamford, Connecticut, became a 50.2% owner of the BC Telephone Company when the Theodore Gary Company merged with GTE in 1955. The "North-West Telephone Company" was officially merged into the BC Telephone Company on 1 January 1961. In 1979 the BC Telephone Company acquired Automatic Electric Canada and formed "AEL Microtel". Soon afterwards the name was shortened to "Microtel". In 1982 "BTE - Business Terminal Equipment" was formed to compete in the newly deregulated premises equipment field. BC Telephone formed "BC Cellular" in 1985 to compete in the new cellular telephone business. On 1 May 1993 BC Telephone reorganised under holding company "BC Telecom Inc" and changed its legal operating name to "BC Tel".

Merger with TELUS
The deregulation of the phone industry in the 1990s combined with the competition of copper lines with cell phones, totally changed the business environment. In a 1999 "merger of equals", BC Tel merged with Telus, the telephone operating company in Alberta. The merger created the second largest telephone company in Canada after Bell.  Initially registered as BCT.Telus, the hunt for a new name began. Soon after it was announced that the merged company would keep the Telus name, but move into BC Tel's former headquarters in Burnaby, British Columbia.

References

External links
 

Companies based in Burnaby
Defunct companies of British Columbia
Telus
Defunct telecommunications companies of Canada
Telecommunications companies established in 1904
Telecommunications companies disestablished in 1999
Canadian companies disestablished in 1999
Canadian companies established in 1904